The 2020–21 AC Sparta Prague season was the club's 126th season in existence and the 28th consecutive season in the top flight of Czech football. In addition to the domestic league, AC Sparta Prague participated in this season's editions of the Czech Cup and the UEFA Europa League. The season covered the period from 1 August 2020 to 30 June 2021.

Players

First-team squad
.

Out on loan

Other players under contract

Transfers

In

Out

Loans in

Loans out

Pre-season and friendlies

Competitions

Overview

Czech First League

League table

Results summary

Results by round

Matches

Czech Cup

UEFA Europa League

Group stage

The group stage draw was held on 2 October 2020.

Statistics

Appearances

Goals

Assists

Discipline

Yellow cards

Red cards

References

External links

AC Sparta Prague seasons
Sparta Prague
Sparta Prague